Raggedy Man is a 1981 American drama film based on William D. Wittliff and Sara Clark's 1979 novel, and directed by Jack Fisk. It follows a divorced mother and telephone switchboard operator living with her two sons in a small town during World War II. The film was Spacek’s first film after her Academy Award-winning performance in Coal Miner’s Daughter, and was also her first film to be directed by her husband. For this role, Spacek received a Golden Globe nomination for Best Actress in a Motion Picture - Drama. Henry Thomas, who made his film debut role, later starred in his breakout role for the film E.T. the Extra-Terrestrial.

Plot
Nita Longley is a divorced mother of two boys and a World War II switchboard operator working for a telephone company in Gregory, Texas. She splits from her unfaithful husband four years prior. A sole operator for the small town, Nita is on-call day and night. She petitions her boss Mr. Rigby for a secretarial job with regular working hours, but Rigby tells her that because of wartime her job is “frozen” and that everyone has to make sacrifices.

Nita's status as a single mother makes her the target of not only town gossip but also of unwanted attention from men. Two brothers, Calvin and Arnold Triplett, frequently peep in on and harass Nita at her home. One of the townspeople is the nameless “raggedy man”, a man with a disfigured face who is always dragging around a lawnmower. The raggedy man is usually seen lurking in the background when the Triplett brothers try to intimidate Nita’s sons, Harry and William Henry.

After a night of drinking, Calvin knocks on a door, but is rebuffed by Nita, who tells him the telephone company does not allow after-hours visitors. One night, Teddy Roebuck, a sailor on leave, arrives at Nita’s doorstep in need of a pay phone so he can contact his fiancée. A heartbroken Teddy learns his fiancée is now involved with another man. Nita offers Teddy a cup of coffee to cheer him up, and they form a bond. With nowhere else to go, Teddy decides to spend the rest of his leave with Nita and her sons. He becomes close with the boys and takes them on a bus trip to a beachside carnival, and he and Nita fall in love with each other.

After Calvin and Arnold try to get a peek at Nita bathing, Nita telephones Sheriff Watson to report a peeping Tom. Though the sheriff does not find anyone, he tells Nita that everyone in town is talking about the stranger staying with her. When Nita mentions having seen the raggedy man near her house, the sheriff explains the man is a harmless drifter named Bailey who has been around town the past couple of years mowing lawns.

When Teddy is seen on Nita’s porch without his shirt on, it further sparks the townspeople’s gossip. Nita letting another man stay in her home particularly incenses Calvin and Arnold, who are still angry at her rejection of them. They lure William Henry to the town bar and try to ask him intimate questions about his mother. Teddy walks in and gets in a fight with Arnold and Calvin. After tending to Teddy’s injuries, Nita and Teddy agree it would be best for him to leave town. The boys sadly bid Teddy goodbye, and Harry resentfully blames Teddy’s departure on his mother. When Harry protests he wants to go to live with his father, Nita counters that his father has never returned for him.

After her application for a job transfer is met with resistance from Mr. Rigby, Nita decides to buy three one-way bus tickets to San Antonio from the local agent. That night, Harry goes outside to use the outhouse, but Calvin locks him inside. He and Arnold invade Nita’s house, unplugging the telephone system and cutting the lights. Suddenly someone outside starts Calvin’s truck, honks the horn, and aims its lights at the front porch. When Arnold steps outside with a knife to investigate, he sees it is the raggedy man. Arnold manages to stab the raggedy man, but after a struggle the raggedy man kills both Arnold and Calvin before they can harm Nita and her sons. Nita finds Arnold and the raggedy man lying dead on the porch. Looking closer at the raggedy man’s disfigured face, Nita realizes “Bailey” is actually her long-lost, unfaithful husband and the boys’ father, Harry Longley, Sr. (Sam Shepard).

The next day, with the sheriff’s blessings, Nita and her sons board the bus to San Antonio. Harry is happy that their father returned to protect them, and they agree they will see Teddy again.

Cast
 Sissy Spacek as Nita Longley
 Eric Roberts as Teddy
 R. G. Armstrong as Rigby
 Sam Shepard as Bailey
 William Sanderson as Calvin
 Henry Thomas as Harry
 Carey Hollis as Henry
 Tracey Walter as Arnold

Critical reception 
The film was well-received by critics. On review aggregate site Rotten Tomatoes, it holds a score of 83% based on 6 reviews. In his review which awarded the film 3 and 1/2 stars, critic Roger Ebert opined that while the melodramatic ending and reveal was unnecessary, the “surface events of small-town life are wonderfully observed”. Ebert praised the performances of Spacek as well as of Roberts, writing, “He is often overwrought in his acting; here, playing more quietly, [Roberts] expresses great reserve of tenderness and strength, and is very effective”.

References

External links
 
 
 
 
 

1981 drama films
1981 films
American drama films
Films scored by Jerry Goldsmith
Films set in Texas
Films shot in Texas
Films directed by Jack Fisk
Films based on American novels
1981 directorial debut films
Universal Pictures films
San Patricio County, Texas
1980s English-language films
1980s American films